Euphorbia kansuensis is a species of plant in the family Euphorbiaceae, native to China.

References 

yinshanica